Elections to Rossendale Borough Council were held on 10 June 2004.  One third of the council was up for election and the Conservative party gained overall control of the council from no overall control.

After the election, the composition of the council was
Conservative 25
Labour 9
Liberal Democrat 1
Independent 1

Election result

Ward results

References
2004 Rossendale election result
 Ward results
Results - council elections 

2003
2004 English local elections
2000s in Lancashire